Harvey Merrigan (born 4 December 1949) is a former Australian rules footballer who played with Fitzroy in the VFL during the 1970s. He won Fitzroy's Best and Fairest in 1974, only the second fullback to win the award for the club with the other being Vic Chanter.  

In a game against Melbourne in 1979, Fitzroy put on 238 points and Merrigan kicked the goal that enabled them to pass the record for highest score in a VFL game.

External links

References

1949 births
Australian rules footballers from Victoria (Australia)
Fitzroy Football Club players
Mitchell Medal winners
Living people